was a concubine of Emperor Kōnin of Japan and the mother of Emperor Kanmu. Her full name was Takano no Asomi Niigasa.

Life
Niigasa was a daughter of Yamato no Ototsugu (和乙継). She became a concubine of Prince Shirakabe (白壁王), grandson of Emperor Tenji, and bore Prince Yamabe (山部王) in 737 and Prince Sawara (早良王) in 750. Prince Shirakabe was married to Princess Inoe (井上内親王), a daughter of Emperor Shōmu (聖武天皇) in 744. When Empress Kōken died in 770, Shirakabe was appointed her successor and acceded to the throne as Emperor Kōnin. Princess Inoe and her son, Prince Osabe, were nominated as the Empress and the crown prince respectively, because of her noble birth.

The sons of Niigasa had not been considered to be successors until 772, when the Empress (Inoe) was suddenly stripped of her rank following accusations that she had cursed the Emperor. The crown prince, her son, was also disinherited. They were dead two years later. Subsequently, Niigasa's son Prince Yamabe was appointed as the crown prince and acceded to the throne as Emperor Kanmu.

Legacy
In 2001, Emperor Akihito told reporters "I, on my part, feel a certain kinship with Korea, given the fact that it is recorded in the Chronicles of Japan that the mother of Emperor Kammu [Niigasa] was one of the descendant of  King Muryong of Baekje." It was the first time that a Japanese emperor publicly referred to Korean blood in the imperial line. According to the Shoku Nihongi, Niigasa (720–790) is a descendant of Prince Junda, son of Muryeong, who died in Japan in 513 (Nihon Shoki Chapter 17).

Notes

External links
  Yamato (和) and Takano (高野) clans : the descendant of prince Junda, son of Muryeong of Paekche

Japanese nobility
790 deaths
Japanese concubines
Year of birth unknown
Japanese people of Korean descent
Emperor Kanmu
Japanese posthumous empresses